Vladimir Andreyevich Puchkov (born January 1, 1959, in Novinka at Volgograd Oblast) is a Russian politician who served as Minister of Emergency Situations from May 2012 to May 2018.

He holds the military rank of General Lieutenant.

Biography

Education
 1979 — graduated from Tyumen High Military Engineering Command School (Тюменское высшее военно-инженерное командное училище)
 1988 — attended The Kuybishev Military Engineering Academy (Военно-инженерную академию им. В. В. Куйбышева). Which he graduated in 1991 with specialty in Command Staff of Civil Defense.
 2000 — graduated from the Russian Academy for State Service under the President of Russia, with specialty as Manager for Municipal Management.

Career
1979-1983 — Served in the Engineering Troops in Far East Military District of the Soviet Army.
1983-1986 — Senior Officer of Civil Defense Command (in Kungur, Perm region).
1991-1994 — Teacher of Military courses in Civil Defense affairs.
1995-1997 — Head of Science research Management of the All-Russian Institute of Science Research for Civil Defense and Emergencies Situations.
1997-1999 — Deputy of Head Department for Activities of Population and Territory Protection of the Ministry for Emergencies Situations (МЧС России).
1999-2003 — Deputy Head Department of Civil Defense.
2003-2004 — Head Department of Civil Defense.
2004-2006 — Director for Civil Defense Department of the Emergencies Ministry.
2006-2007 — Head of North-West Regional Center of the Emergencies Control Ministry.
2007-2012 — State Secretary - Deputy Minister for Civil Defense, Emergencies and Elimination of Consequences of Natural Disasters.
Since 2012 — Minister for Civil Defense, Emergencies and Elimination of Consequences of Natural Disasters.

Awards
Medal "200 Years of the Ministry of Defence" (Ministry of Defence)
Awards of the Ministry for Emergency Situations of Russia
Order of Friendship
Order for Personal Courage
Order of Courage

External links
Interview (in Russian)

1959 births
Living people
1st class Active State Councillors of the Russian Federation
People from Volgograd Oblast
United Russia politicians
21st-century Russian politicians
Recipients of the Order "For Personal Courage"
Government ministers of Russia